Northdown is a mini album released by electronica band Psapp exclusively in Japan.  Three of its tracks are exclusive to this album ("Side Dish" and "Dirt Is Falling" were later released on Early Cats and Tracks, "Curuncula" was later released on Tiger, My Friend, and "Happy Lamb" was later released on Early Cats and Tracks Volume 2).

Track listing

Personnel

Psapp

Carim Clasmann
Galia Durant

Additional personnel

Mark Glover - clarinet, "Dirt Is Falling"

Notes 
To date, Northdown's package art is the only to feature elements not created by Durant, though her drawings are incorporated into the design by Japan's marc graphic.  The theme is outmoded technology, perhaps as a comment on Psapp's reputation for using both old and new technology to create their music.  Besides the portable television shown above, the packaging includes photographs of:
A reel-to-reel audio tape recorder on the back of the tray card insert
A tape reel on the CD label
A pocket calculator beneath the clear plastic CD tray
A computer with integrated monitor and drives, similar to the Casio FX-9000P or TRS 80, on the back of the booklet

External links
Psapp official website 
Psapp at Domino Records
Rallye Label (Japan only)
Shopping in Kanazawa (Rallye outside Japan)

2004 debut albums
Psapp albums